Rev. Daniel Ziegler (June 11, 1804 Reading, Pennsylvania – May 23, 1876 York, Pennsylvania) was a minister in Kreutz Creek and York, Pennsylvania, and also an avid entomologist. He was a friend of Dr. Frederick Ernst Melsheimer (1782–1873), who like his father the Rev. Frederick Valentine Melsheimer (1749–1814), was also a keen entomologist. Their collections ended up in Harvard University's Museum of Comparative Zoology, and comprised 14,774 specimens from 5,302 different species.

Ziegler studied at the University of Pennsylvania and, later, theology at the German Reformed Seminary in York. He was the minister for 37 years of Kraeutz-Creek Church near York as well as up to eight other churches. With his wife, Eve Eyster, he had 10 children, including son Dr. H. A. Ziegler.

It was during his time as minister at Kraeutz-Creek that he began studying entomology. He often accompanied his father on insect-collecting excursions, using the beat net method of collecting, uncommon in America at the time.

Rev. Ziegler's only entomological paper, a description of 36 new species of Coleoptera, was published for the assistance of Dr. Melsheimer, whose home was close to one of Rev. Ziegler's churches.

References
 
 "Clergyman an insect expert" - an article in the historical section of the website of the York Daily Record

1804 births
1876 deaths
American entomologists
American Christian clergy
People from York, Pennsylvania
19th-century American clergy